Gözbarax (also, Gözparaq and Gëzbarakh) is a village and municipality in the Zaqatala Rayon of Azerbaijan.  It has a population of 1,841.

References 

Populated places in Zaqatala District